The 1971–72 Indiana Pacers season was the fifth season of the Pacers in the American Basketball Association. The Pacers finished second in the Western Division and won their second ABA title.
In the division semifinals, the Pacers required seven games to eliminate the Denver Rockets. In the division finals, the Utah Stars were eliminated in seven games. The New York Nets appeared in the ABA Championships for the first time and were defeated by the Pacers in six games.

Offseason

ABA Draft

Regular season

Schedule

Roster

Season standings

Player stats
Note: GP= Games played; MIN= Minutes; REB= Rebounds; AST= Assists; PTS = Points; AVG = Average

Transactions

Playoffs
Western Division Semifinals vs. Denver Rockets

Pacers won series, 4–3

Western Division Finals vs. Utah Stars

Pacers won series, 4–3

ABA Finals vs. New York Nets

Pacers won series, 4–2

Awards, records, and honors
 Roger Brown appeared in the 1972 ABA All-Star Game
 Mel Daniels appeared in the 1972 ABA All-Star Game
 Freddie Lewis appeared in the 1972 ABA All-Star Game

References

 Pacers on Basketball Reference

External links
 RememberTheABA.com 1971–72 regular season and playoff results

Indiana
American Basketball Association championship seasons
Indiana Pacers seasons
Indiana Pacers
Indiana Pacers